The group stage of the 1993–94 UEFA Champions League began on 24 November 1993 and ended on 13 April 1994. The eight teams were divided into two groups of four, and the teams in each group played against each other on a home-and-away basis, meaning that each team played a total of six group matches. For each win, teams were awarded two points, with one point awarded for each draw.
At the end of the group stage, the two teams in each group with the most points advanced to the semi-finals.

Groups

Group A

Group B

The game was originally scheduled for 8 December, but was brought forward by a week to allow Milan more time to prepare for the 1993 Intercontinental Cup.

Group stage
UEFA Champions League group stages